Girl of the Night is a film drama starring Anne Francis, made in 1960 by . It was based on a best-seller 1958 book by Harold Greenwald, The Call Girl.

Plot
A taxi driver picks up a woman running through the streets. Her name is Robin "Bobbie" Williams and, because she appears to be injured, she is taken to see a Dr. Mitchell in her apartment building, even though he is a psychologist.

Reluctantly, she reveals to Dr. Mitchell that she is a high-priced call girl. Bobbie agrees to a few sessions with the doctor and tells her story.

Her boyfriend, a man named Larry Taylor, was supposed to be protecting Bobbie on a job. Instead he sat in a bar, flirting with a young woman named Lisa, while an elderly john named Shelton repeatedly struck Bobbie with a cane.

Rowena Claiborne, who arranges "dates" for the prostitutes, persuades Lisa to join Bobbie on a night out with two wealthy clients. One of the men, Jason Franklin, claims to be offended when he discovers that these women are hookers. He intimidates Lisa, who recoils from him and falls through a window to her death.

Rather than sympathize, Larry is angry at Bobbie for costing them future earnings with Rowena. He physically assaults her.  Bobbie is ashamed of her life and finds a job as a file clerk, hoping that no one in her office will discover the truth about her past.

Cast
Anne Francis as Bobbie
Lloyd Nolan as Dr. Mitchell
Kay Medford as Rowena Claiborne
John Kerr as Larry Taylor
Arthur Storch as Jason Franklin, Jr.
James Broderick as Dan Bolton
Eileen Fulton as Lisa
Julius Monk as Swagger
Lauren Gilbert as Mr. Shelton
Judy Tucker
Noah Keen as Al
René Enríquez as Ricardo
Patricia Basch
Jo Anna March as Lucy Worth
Richard Bauman
Louise Manning

References

External links
 Girl of the Night at IMDB

1960 films
Films about prostitution in the United States
Films scored by Sol Kaplan
American drama films
Films based on non-fiction books
1960s English-language films
1960 drama films
1960s American films